Kizuna (stylized as KIZUИA or in all caps) is the second studio album of Japanese boy band JO1, consisting of selected songs from their previous EP singles Challenger, Stranger, and Wandering. The album was released by Lapone Entertainment into four physical editions on May 25, 2022, while the digital version was released two days prior, with Japan Hot 100 number-one song "With Us" acted as the main promotional single. It features the group's frequent collaborators, such as Full8loom, Alive Knob, Teito, Score, and Megatone as well as new participation from Lee Woo-min (Collapsedone), Justin Reinstein, Purple Night, and others.

To promote the album, Kizuna was preceded by two promotional digital singles, "Dreamer" and "Move the Soul", and supported by a six-day long out-of-home advertising campaign at Shinjuku Station, the world's busiest station. JO1 held two live events and participated in the KCON 2022 Premiere in Japan and MTV Live Match and went to South Korea to promote the album on M Countdown and Idol Radio. A 13-show eponymous concert tour was set to start in five prefectures on September 3, 2022.

The album set a record as the group's first album to debut at number one on both the Oricon Albums Chart and Billboard Japan Hot Albums and to receive Platinum certification by the Recording Industry Association of Japan (RIAJ) for over 250,000 units in shipments.

Background and release 
After ending the promotion of their fifth EP single, Wandering, with a special Christmas live at the Tokyo Dome City Hall in December, on January 18, 2022, Japanese boy band JO1 announced that they would release new song "Move the Soul" as the opening theme of Aniplex's original anime series Fanfare of Adolescence, which was set to premiere on April 2. It was followed by the release of "Dreamer", the theme song of the group's first drama series Short Program, on February 14. JO1 subsequently announced on March 22, 2022, that their second studio album Kizuna was slated to be released on May 25. The theme of the album was said to be "recognizing the bond one has with friends after overcoming hardship together".

Kizuna features of a total of 17 songs that were released into five physical editions. Seven of them are selected songs from the group's three previous EP singles, while the rest are seven new songs and the three theme songs: "Prologue", "Dreamer", and "Move the Soul". The promotional single "With You" and the seven selected songs are included in all editions. The two limited editions and the anime edition each features 12 tracks. The limited edition A comes with a bonus DVD featuring a variety segment with the members, titled JO1 What Is Your Kizuna. The limited edition B includes "Dreamer" and a photo book. The anime edition features the Boruto: Naruto Next Generations''' ending theme "Prologue" and "Move the Soul", as well as an illustration of JO1 members by Lay-duce as the jacket cover. Both of the normal edition, which comes with a solo poster, and the fan club edition consist of 15 tracks. The digital special edition consisting all 17 songs was released earlier on May 23, 2022.

 Promotion 
In April 2022, prior to the release of the album, members Ren Kawashiri, Takumi Kawanishi, Sukai Kinjo, Junki Kono, and Sho Yonashiro performed two tracks from the album, "Bokura no Kisetsu" and "Move the Soul", on the music YouTube channel The First Take with a special arrangement. On May 14–15, JO1 performed the two songs as well as  "With Us", "Walk It Like I Talk It", "Dreamer", and "Algorithm" at the KCON 2022 Premiere in Japan. An out-of-home advertising campaign was held on the 45.6 meter length LED signage of Shinjuku Wall 456 from May 16 to May 22 at Shinjuku Station, the world's busiest station according to the Guinness World Records. The campaign was preceded with a teaser image of a circle and a message saying "we are always one", which was posted as an Instagram Story on the group's official account on May 15, 2022. According to a representative from Lapone Entertainment, the circular shape was chosen as the prominent theme of the advertisement to express "a sense of unity, stability, and bond".

On the album's release day, JO1 held a commemorative event in front of 400 fans at Toyosu Pit, Tokyo, where they performed "With Us" and "Touch!" as well as announced their first arena tour to four prefectures throughout September 2022. On June 5, 2022, the group participated at the MTV Live Match along with Fantastics from Exile Tribe, Astro, and W-inds as the closing act, performing "With Us", "Walk It Like I Talk It", and "Move the Soul". The group then held a showcase event in front of 500 fans at the KT Zepp Yokohama on June 20. Besides the lead track "With Us", they also performed "Walk It Like I Talk It", "Algorithm", "Touch!", and "Zero".

In July, JO1 started their promotion outside Japan. On July 28, they performed the Korean version of "With Us" on M Countdown. On August 9, members Ren Kawashiri, Junki Kono, Takumi Kawanishi, and Shion Tsurubo made the group's first appearance in a South Korean radio on MBC's Idol Radio, with Kino and Yuto of the boy group Pentagon acted as the special DJs. During the live broadcast, the four members sang the song "Zero" in front of 200 spectators.

 Singles 
Challenger was released as the album's lead single on April 28, 2021. The retro funk influenced lead track "Born to be Wild" peaked atop the Billboard Japan Hot 100. The single ranked first on the Oricon Singles Chart with 254,111 copies sold in its first week.

Stranger was released as the album's second single on August 18, 2021. Maintaining JO1's number-one streak on the Oricon Singles Chart, Stranger surpassed the total sales of the group's last two singles in its second week. It subsequently became JO1's fastest single to surpass 400,000 copies sold on the Billboard Japan chart at that time. The single's Japan Hot 100 number-one futurepop EDM lead track "Real" was produced by Jung Ho-hyun, who has worked with groups such as Wanna One and Exo.

The album's third single, Wandering, was released on December 15, 2021, with double lead tracks,  and "Prologue". The latter was used as the ending theme of anime series Boruto: Naruto Next Generations. The songs peaked at number one and forty-nine on Japan Hot 100, respectively. Supported by a week-long nationwide out-of-home advertising campaign, titled #Find_the _JO1, Wandering earned the group their highest first-week physical and combined sales to date on the Oricon Charts, surpassing their debut single Protostar. The single was the first release by JO1 that earned a Double Platinum certification by the Recording Industry Association of Japan (RIAJ) for over a half million units in shipments.

 Promotional singles 
The first promotional single "Dreamer" was released as the ending theme of Short Program and described as "a cheering song with impressive lyrics filled with hope for the future". It was composed in the key of D-sharp major, 146 beats per minute with a running time of 4 minutes and 14 seconds. The song was produced by Justin Reinstein and the Japanese producing team 7th Avenue. Its music video featuring scenes from the series was released the next day on February 15, 2022. The song peaked at number 32 on the Oricon Combined Singles Chart, becoming JO1's first non lead-track that entered the chart. It also peaked at number 35 on Japan Hot 100.

"Move the Soul" was released digitally on April 3, 2022, as the opening theme of Fanfare of the adolescence, followed by the release of its performance and dance practice videos. The song was described as a melodic song with a fast-paced sound and high-pitched vocals, which "connects the story of the anime's main characters and the path of JO1 so far", that was dedicated for people "who push towards their dream". Composed in the key of B minor, the song was produced by the South Korean-Japanese producing team Purple Night. The song debuted at number 19 and 16 on the Japan Hot 100 and Oricon Combined Singles Chart, respectively. On April 20, the song was performed by members Ren Kawashiri, Takumi Kawanishi, Sukai Kinjo, Junki Kono, and Sho Yonashiro on the music YouTube channel The First Take. A special music video of the song was released on June 16, 2022, as part of the group's collaboration project with the Japan Racing Association.

The album's lead track and main promotional single, "With Us", was released on May 2, 2022, followed by the music video the next day. In line with the theme of the album, the song conveyed the message of "let's walk with us forever, even if there are difficulties" and expressed the determination to "see the same scenery at the top". Composed by Lee Woo-min (Collapsedone) and Justin Reinstein in the key of F-sharp major, it debuted at number 17 and 15 on the Japan Hot 100 and Oricon Combined Singles Chart, respectively. "With Us" was performed live for the first time at the KCON 2022 Premiere held on May 14–15, followed by performances in several music shows such as Music Blood, Venue101, and CDTV Live Live. The song was also performed at the 2022 Sanrio Fes on June 16, 2022.

Concert tour

To support the promotion of Kizuna, JO1 embarked on their first concert tour, the 2022 JO1 1st Arena Live Tour "Kizuna". They toured Aichi, Osaka, Kanagawa, and Fukuoka with a total of 10 shows from September 3 to September 22, 2022. On August 12, additional three shows in Tokyo on October 22-23 and a livestreaming for the Fukuoka show on September 22 were announced. The set list included songs from the group's first single, Protostar'', and was supported by a live band performance for the entire concert. The concert tour amassed a total of 110,000 audience in attendance. A nationwide Blu-ray and DVD release was scheduled for March 15, 2023, featuring the Tokyo show on October 23, 2022, with a 55-minute behind-the-scenes bonus footage. The performance of "Infinity" from the Blu-ray/DVD was released as a teaser on the group's official YouTube channel on January 13, 2023.

Set list
The set list for the September 22 show in Fukuoka and the October 23 show in Tokyo was the following:
{{hidden
| headercss = background:lavender; font-size: 100%; width: 75%;
| contentcss = text-align: left; font-size: 100%; width: 75%;
| header = Fukuoka set list
| content =

 "Move the Soul"
 "Born to be Wild"
 "Algorithm"
 "YOLO-konde"
 "Walk It Like I Talk It"
 "Shine a Light"
 "Monstar"
 "Dreamer" (Kawanishi, Kono, Mamehara)
 "Icarus" (Kawashiri, Kinjo, Sato, Shiroiwa)
 "So What" (Ohira, Kimata, Tsurubo, Yonashiro)
 "Kimi no Mama"
 "Zero"
 "Bokura no Kisetsu"
 "SuperCali"
 "Infinity"
 "La Pa Pa Pam"
 "Speed of Light"
 "All Hours"
 "Oh-Eh-Oh"
 "GrandMaster"
 "Real"
Encore
  Medley ("Dreaming Night", "Touch!", "My Friends", "Run&Go")
 "With Us"

Notes
 indicates song performed only on September 22, 2022
}}

{{hidden
| headercss = background:lavender; font-size: 100%; width: 75%;
| contentcss = text-align: left; font-size: 100%; width: 75%;
| header = Tokyo set list
| content =

 "Move the Soul"
 "Born to be Wild"
 "Algorithm"
 "YOLO-konde"
 "Walk It Like I Talk It"
 "Shine a Light"
 "Bokura no Kisetsu"
 "Running" (Kawashiri, Tsurubo, Yonashiro)
 "Get Inside Me" (Ohira, Kawanishi, Kimata, Kono)
 "Kungchikita" (Kinjo, Sato, Shiroiwa, Mamehara)
 "Be With You"
 "Zero"
 "Ryūseiu"
 "SuperCali"
 "Infinity"
 "La Pa Pa Pam"
 "Rose"
 "Speed of Light"
 "Oh-Eh-Oh"
 "GrandMaster"
 "Real"
Encore
  Medley ("Dreaming Night", "Stay", "Touch!", "My Friends", "Run&Go")
 "With Us"
Double Encore
  "Kimi no Mama"

Notes
 indicates song performed only on October 23, 2022
}}

Tour dates

Commercial performance
Upon its release, Kizuna debuted at number one on the Oricon Daily Albums Chart with 213,592 copies sold and eventually became the group's first album to top the weekly chart with an estimated sales of 261,000 copies. The album was certified Platinum by the Recording Industry Association of Japan for shipments of over 250,000 physical units. It also debuted at number one on the Billboard Japan Hot Albums, topping both the download and the sales component charts with over 300,000 copies sold in its first week, which led to JO1's first number-one place on the Japan Artist 100. With its first week sales, Kizuna earned third and fifth place on the Mid-Year Top Album Sales and Hot Albums chart, respectively. By the end of 2022, the album ranked tenth on the Billboard Japans annual album sales chart with 333,607 physical copies sold.

Track listing

Credits and personnel 
Credits are adapted from the album's liner notes. Track listing is based on Kizuna special edition.

Musicians 

 JO1 – vocals 
 Lee Woo-min (Collapsedone) – computer programming , piano , synthesizer , acoustic guitar , bass , digital editing 
 Justin Reinstein – computer programming , piano , synthesizer ,
 Heon-seo – chorus ,
 Choi Hye-sun – drum , piano , synthesizer 
 Seo Ye-ji – bass , keyboard , guitar 
 Esbee – chorus , drum , bass , piano , keyboard  synthesizer , guitar 
 think – chorus 
 Woo-jae – drum , bass , piano , keyboard  synthesizer , guitar 
 O'neal – drum , bass , piano , keyboard  synthesizer , guitar 
 Last.P – drum , bass , piano , keyboard  synthesizer , guitar 
 Lee Ji-won – chorus 
 Kim Ju-yeong – chorus 
 Jang Jun-ho – drum , bass , piano , keyboard , synthesizer 
 Lim Ki-jun – drum , bass , piano , keyboard , synthesizer 
 Koh Myoung-jae – guitar 
 Mun Hanmiru – chorus , keyboard 
 Mirror Boy – drum , bass , piano , guitar 
 D.ham – synthesizer 
 Purple Night – chorus , drum , bass , piano , keyboard , synthesizer , guitar , MIDI programming , electric piano 
 Mook – chorus 
 Lee Min-young (Eastwest) – drum , bass , guitar 
 Yeul (1by1) – drum , piano , synthesizer 
 Lee Tae-wook – guitar 
 Masataka Hirota – chorus 
 Funk Uchino – strings director 
 Lee Ji-su - chorus 
 Score (13) – drum , piano 
 Kim Byung-seok – bass , keyboard 
 Dono – chorus 
 Jung Ho-hyun – keyboard 
  – chorus 
 Teito – drum , bass , synthesizer 
 Park Joong-hun – piano , keyboard 
 Jkun – guitar 
 On the string – strings 
 Nile Lee – strings arrangement 
 Kim Ga-yeong – bass , keyboard , synthesizer 
 Luke – chorus 
 Pop time – keyboard 
 Daily – keyboard 
 Nmore (Prismfilter) – keyboard 
 Kitae Park (Prismfilter) – guitar 
  – MIDI programming , drum , electric piano 
 Yohei – chorus

Technicals 

 Tatsuya Kawakami – recording 
 Yuki Takeuchi – recording 
 Shin Bong-won – recording , mixing 
 Shiota Osamu - recording 
 Kim Min-hee – recording 
 Sora Tamiya – chorus recording 
 Skinner Box – digital editing 
 Lee Chang-hoon – digital editing 
 Full8loom – digital editing 
 Mirror Boy – digital editing 
 Mun Hanmiru – digital editing 
 Purple Night – digital editing 
 Lee Min-young (Eastwest) – digital editing 
 Kamata Masato – digital editing , mixing  
 Jeong Yoo-ra – digital editing 
 Jung Hyo-hyun – digital editing 
 UTA – digital editing 
 Gu Jong-pil – mixing 
 Master Key – mixing 
 Uncle Joe – mixing 
 Park Gyeong-seon – mixing 
 Anchor – mixing 
 Kang Dong-ho – asst. mixing 
 Jeon Bu-yeon – asst. mixing 
 Kwon Nam-woo – mastering 
 Morisaki Masato - mastering

Locations

Recording
 Alive Recording Studio
 Sound Valley
 GLAB Studios
 Sony Music Studios
 821 Sound
 Studio Fine
 Seoul Studio
 Prime Sound Studio Form

Mixing
 GLAB Studios
 Klang Studio
 821 Sound
 JoeLab
 Boost Knob
 Studio Vision
 Prismfilter Mix Lab

Mastering
 821 Sound Mastering
 Artisans Mastering

Vocal editing
 Kwang Sound

Digital editing
 Studio Vision

Visual

 Ahmi (Studio Muet) – album design
 Roh Yun-ah (Studio Muet) – album design
 Min In-hong – style director
 Hirohisa Nakano – photographer
 Pepe Yurie – photographer (bonus photo)
 Kazuma Tsujimoto – photographic assistant
 Masanobu Nishiguchi (Crea Leaf) – retouch
 Kazue Sudo (LiNK-UP) – retouch
 Reiko Goto (R.mond inc) – art set designer
 Masahiro Ujie (Malivue Inc.) – creative coordinator
 Koji Nakao(Malivue Inc.) – creative coordinator
 Kaede Osawa (Malivue Inc.) – creative coordinate assistant
 Masasaki Ida – wardrobe
 Ko Fukuchi – wardrobe
 Makato Okuno – hair & make–up
 Mika Sasaki – hair & make–up
 Yuko Tamura – hair & make–up
 Sayuri Nishio – hair & make–up
 Akane Komoto – hair & make–up
 Seika Shimada – hair & make–up
 Mihawkback – choreography 
 Team Same – choreography 
 Jong Young (The BIPS) – choreography 
 Sung-chan – choreography

Charts

Weekly charts

Monthly charts

Year-end charts

Certifications

Release history

References 

JO1 albums
2022 albums
Japanese-language albums